Lenka Vandasova (born 1985) is a Czech female
canoeist who won six medals at individual senior level at the Wildwater Canoeing World Championships and European Wildwater Championships.

References

1985 births
Living people
Czech female canoeists
Place of birth missing (living people)